

The 2021 Australian Women in Music Awards are the forthcoming third Australian Women in Music Awards. The event was scheduled to take place on 5 and 6 October 2021 but on 31 August 2021, but delayed to 19 May 2022.

17 award categories will be presented, two more from 2019 with the Inaugural Tina Arena Special Impact Award and Live Production Touring Award being added. Nominations opened on 25 May 2021 and close on 6 July. The Tina Arena Special Impact Award named after Tina Arena, will honour an unsung champion (working diligently and tirelessly, with little recognition) whose personal journey, contribution and service to industry has had an extensive impact on the Australian music community as a whole. In May 2021, Arena said, "I believe that by working together, alongside the leadership of AWMA, we have an unprecedented opportunity to improve the culture of the Australian music industry for the better, and pave the way for more women to be recognised across the sector."

Queensland premier Annastacia Palaszczuk expressed her excitement saying "It is wonderful to see this fantastic showcase of female talent, proudly supported by the Queensland Government, back on Australia's events calendar."

The finalists were announced on 31 August 2021.

AWMA Honour Roll
 Olivia Newton-John

Nominees and winners

AWMA Awards
Winners indicated in boldface, with other nominees in plain.

References

External links
 

2021 in Australian music
2021 music awards